Chattahoochee is a city in Gadsden County, Florida, United States. Its history dates to the Spanish era. The population was 3,652 as of the 2010 census, up from 3,287 at the 2000 census. It is part of the Tallahassee, Florida Metropolitan Statistical Area. Chattahoochee sits on the banks of the Apalachicola River, and is separated by the Apalachicola and Victory bridges from neighboring Sneads, Florida, which is in Jackson County.  Chattahoochee has its own police force with over ten sworn officers and a police chief. Chattahoochee is a name derived from the Creek language meaning "marked rocks".

History
The area was inhabited by indigenous peoples who built mounds in the area (Chattahoochee Oanding Mounds). Chattahoochee was established as Mount Vernon in the 1820s. A British Fort, Nicolls' Outpost was built in the area. The Scott Massacre of 1817 took place. A ferry was established.

Geography

Chattahoochee is located in the northwest corner of Gadsden County at 30°42′N 84°51′W (30.703, –84.847). It is bordered to the west by the Apalachicola River, formed by the juncture of the Chattahoochee and Flint rivers within Lake Seminole just north of the city. The northern border of Chattahoochee follows the Florida–Georgia state line, and the Apalachicola River forms the Gadsden–Jackson county line.

Main Street (Little Sycamore Road outside the city limits) leads south  via Flat Creek Road to Interstate 10 at Exit 166.

The southern part of the city includes the community of River Junction at 30°41′N 84°50′W (30.686, –84.841). In the mid-1880s, River Junction was established as a railroad connection point between the Florida Central & Western, later the Seaboard Air Line, and the Pensacola & Atlantic. The connecting track survives.

Demographics

2020 census

As of the 2020 United States census, there were 2,955 people, 940 households, and 552 families residing in the city. 

The median household income was $40,000. 9.4% of the population over 25 years old had a Bachelor's degree or higher. There was an employment rate of 28.1%. 29.5% of the population lived without healthcare coverage.

Historic places
On January 6, 1861, 4 days before Florida delegates formally seceded from the Union as part of the American Civil War, state troops seized the federal Arsenal located in the town. The former arsenal and current Administration Building of Florida State Hospital is listed on the National Register of Historic Places (Building - #73000578). Florida State Hospital, the hospital involved in the famous United States Supreme Court decision O'Connor v. Donaldson, is located within the City.  The hospital was featured in a 1989 movie, Chattahoochee, starring Gary Oldman and Dennis Hopper, in which a war hero, Chris Calhoun, is involuntarily committed to Florida State Hospital where he sees doctors at the hospital humiliating patients and experiences filth and abuse.

Government and infrastructure
The U.S. Postal Service operates the Chattahoochee Post Office.

The Chattahoochee Volunteer Fire Department operates one fire station.

The Gadsden Connector, a bus route operated by Big Bend Transit, has a stop in Chattahoochee.

Education
Gadsden County School District operates public schools.

The community is served by Chattahoochee Elementary School. In Fall 2018 it will become a Pre-K to Kindergarten early learning center. Students in grades 1–3 will move to Greensboro Primary School and students in grades 4–5 will move to West Gadsden Middle School. The sole public high school of the county is Gadsden County High School (formerly East Gadsden High School).

Until 2004 Chattahoochee High School served as the community middle and high school. That year it consolidated into West Gadsden High School. As of 2017 East Gadsden became the only remaining zoned high school in the county due to the consolidation of West Gadsden High's high school section into East Gadsden High School.

Notable people

Roger Bailey, MLB pitcher for the Colorado Rockies 
Shantley Jackson, Horse Jockey

In film

The 1989 film "Chattahoochee" is based on the Florida State Hospital and allegations of abuse on residents. The movie, which starred Gary Oldman and Dennis Hopper, was not shot in Chattahoochee, however.

Footnotes

External links

City of Chattahoochee official website

Cities in Gadsden County, Florida
Tallahassee metropolitan area
Cities in Florida
1941 establishments in Florida
Populated places established in 1941